Uncharacterized methyltransferase WBSCR22 is an enzyme that in humans is encoded by the WBSCR22 gene.

This gene encodes a protein containing a nuclear localization signal and an S-adenosyl-L-methionine binding motif typical of methyltransferases, suggesting that the encoded protein may act on DNA methylation. This gene is deleted in Williams syndrome, a multisystem developmental disorder caused by the deletion of contiguous genes at 7q11.23.

References

Further reading